Till, der Junge von nebenan is a German television series.

See also
List of German television series

External links
 

German children's television series
Television shows set in Berlin
1967 German television series debuts
1967 German television series endings
ZDF original programming
German-language television shows